The 2021 season for  was its 12th season overall and its fifth season as a UCI WorldTeam. It was also the fifth season under the current name.

Team roster 

Riders who joined the team for the 2021 season

Riders who left the team during or after the 2020 season

Season victories

National, Continental, and World Champions

References

External links 
 

Bora-Hansgrohe
2021
Bora-Hansgrohe